Mahjouba Oubtil (born 15 December 1982) is a Moroccan female boxer. At the 2012 Summer Olympics, she competed in the Women's lightweight competition, but was defeated in the second round by Adriana Araújo of Brazil.

References

Moroccan women boxers
1982 births
Living people
Lightweight boxers
Olympic boxers of Morocco
Boxers at the 2012 Summer Olympics